Saving Grace is an American crime drama television series which aired on TNT from July 23, 2007, to June 21, 2010. The show stars Holly Hunter as well as Leon Rippy, Kenny Johnson, Laura San Giacomo, Bailey Chase, Bokeem Woodbine, Gregory Norman Cruz and Yaani King. It is set in Oklahoma City—including numerous shots of local buildings and landmarks (such as the Oklahoma City National Memorial and the downtown skyline)—while much of the show was filmed in Vancouver and Los Angeles.

The theme song for the show was written and performed by American rapper-musician Everlast. The series is rated TV-MA in the United States for language, sexuality, and violence.

Plot
The plot focuses on Grace Hanadarko (Holly Hunter), a heavy drinking and promiscuous Oklahoma City detective. In the series opener, Grace meets up with her "last-chance" angel when, after a night of drinking, she runs down and kills a pedestrian with her Porsche. 

In desperation, she calls out for God's help; and a scruffy, tobacco-spitting man, who calls himself Earl (Leon Rippy), appears. Unfolding his wings to reveal his divine origins, Earl tells her that she is headed for Hell and asks if she is ready to turn her life over to God. When he finally disappears, the person she struck is also gone and it is as if the accident never happened. The only evidence left is a small amount of the victim's blood on her blouse, which she takes to her best friend, forensic science expert Rhetta Rodriguez (Laura San Giacomo), to analyze. With Rhetta's help, Grace discovers that the victim in her accident is actually a man awaiting execution on death row, Leon Cooley (Bokeem Woodbine). When she visits Cooley in prison, he reveals that he has also had encounters with Earl.

Passionate in her job, Grace investigates homicides and other major crimes with the other detectives in her squad, including Ham Dewey (Kenny Johnson), Butch Ada (Bailey Chase), Bobby Stillwater (Gregory Cruz), and Captain Kate Perry (Lorraine Toussaint).

Off the job, Grace drinks heavily, engages in numerous one-night stands and casual encounters with men, and is having an affair with her married police partner, Ham. Aside from her faults, Grace is an extraordinarily loving and generous person to those around her. In particular, she loves her young nephew, Clay (Dylan Minnette), and devotes a great deal of time to him.

Earl appears to Grace throughout the series, hoping she'll turn away from her more self-destructive tendencies and seek God's help. Saving Grace uses Grace's story to discuss the topic of faith and how difficult faith can be in such an imperfect world.

Oklahoma City
Series creator Nancy Miller grew up in Oklahoma City, and as a result Saving Grace includes many references to Oklahoma City and the state of Oklahoma. For instance, many of the characters' last names are the names of Oklahoma towns: Hanadarko is derived from Anadarko, Oklahoma; also Clay Norman, Ham Dewey, Butch Ada, Bobby Stillwater, and Captain Perry all have last names taken from Oklahoma towns and cities.

The 1995 bombing of Oklahoma City's Alfred P. Murrah Federal Building and its aftermath have been frequently incorporated into the plot and character development of the series. In the show, Grace's sister, who was also Clay's mother, died in the bombing.

In addition, local Oklahoma City eating establishment Johnnies Charcoal Broiler is frequently incorporated.

In an October 2007 trip to Oklahoma City by the cast, writers and producers, Oklahoma City Mayor Mick Cornett presented Miller and Hunter with Keys to the City.

Episodes

Cast and characters

Holly Hunter as Grace Hanadarko
Leon Rippy as Earl
Kenny Johnson as Hamilton "Ham" Dewey
Laura San Giacomo as Rhetta Rodriguez
Bailey Chase as Butch Ada
Gregory Norman Cruz as Bobby Stillwater
Lorraine Toussaint as Captain Kate Perry
Dylan Minnette as Clay Norman
Bokeem Woodbine as Leon Cooley (seasons 1–2; guest season 3)
Tom Irwin as Father Johnny Hanadarko
Mark L. Taylor as Henry Silver
Yaani King as Neely Lloyd (season 3)

Production
Following a 13-episode first season which ran from July 23 to December 18, 2007, Saving Grace ran for a second season of 14 episodes which began on July 14, 2008, and ended on April 13, 2009. The second season was split; the first half ran in the summer of 2008, and the second half ran in the spring of 2009. The third season of Saving Grace began airing on June 16, 2009, shifting from the Monday night slot it had occupied for the first two seasons to Tuesday night.

On August 13, 2009, the show's producer, Fox Television Studios, canceled the series, despite its high ratings, due to disappointing overseas and DVD sales. TNT had originally ordered a split 15-episode third season, with nine episodes to be aired in the summer and six to be aired in the winter of 2009.  Due to the show's cancellation, the summer season ended with ten episodes (one episode, "What Would You Do?", slated for season 2, was delayed until season 3, adding one to the nine originally ordered for the summer), and in March 2010 TNT began airing what were advertised as the final episodes. These were the six remaining episodes of the season, with three new episodes added to give the series closure. The final episode of Saving Grace aired on June 21, 2010.

DVD releases

The 19 episodes that aired June–August 2009 and March–June 2010 were released collectively as a third and final season.

International broadcasts
UK: Season 1 began on More4 on Monday 29 August 2009 at 11:00 P.M. Season 2 began after a considerable gap on Thursday 26 January 2012 at 10:35 P.M.

Portugal: Season 1 and 2 already have been broadcast on Fox Life.
Season 1 - Thursday at 9:00 P.M.
Season 2 - Monday at 9:50 P.M.
The third season is currently airing on Fox Next which is also rerunning the previous two seasons.

In Australia, Season 1 has just begun airing on 9 August 2011 on Channel 10 at midnight most week nights.

Japan: Season 1 began on 14 December 2008. Season 2 began on 11 December 2009.

In Quebec, Canada, the series began airing in French on March 5, 2009, on Thursday nights at 9:00 P.M. On March 16, 2010, when season two of the series began, it had its timeslot changed to Tuesday nights at 9:00 P.M. replacing Bones after its fourth season concluded. The channel decided to air the 10 episodes of the final season following the second season.

Reception

Critical reception
The New York Post; Reviewed by: Adam Buckman; Grade: 100; Both The Closer and Saving Grace are at the top of their games in tonight's premiere episodes. 
New York Daily News; Reviewed by: David Hinckley; Grade: 80; This will be good news to people who enjoy watching train wrecks in which the engineer accelerates as the precipice nears, which is Grace's signature move.

U.S. ratings

For calendar-year 2008 on a first-run basis, the series garnered 1.59 million adults in the 18-49 demo.

Awards and nominations

References

External links

 

2007 American television series debuts
2010 American television series endings
2000s American crime drama television series
2000s American mystery television series
2000s American police procedural television series
2010s American crime drama television series
2010s American mystery television series
2010s American police procedural television series
American fantasy drama television series
Angels in television
English-language television shows
Religious drama television series
Television series by 20th Century Fox Television
Television shows filmed in Vancouver
Television shows set in Oklahoma
TNT (American TV network) original programming